Anthony Webbe (died 1578?), of St. Andrew's, Canterbury and Fordwich, Kent.

Family
Webbe was the son of the MP George Webbe of Canterbury and his wife Anne (died 1551). Webbe married a woman named Dorothy, who outlived him, dying in 1594. They had at least five sons and one daughter.

Career
He was involved in local politics and was made a Freeman of Canterbury in 1552, sheriff for 1563–64, an alderman in 1569 and mayor for 1571–72.
He was elected a Member of Parliament (MP) for Canterbury in 1572.

References

Year of birth missing
1570s deaths
People from Canterbury
Sheriffs of Canterbury
Mayors of Canterbury
English MPs 1572–1583